KXXE (92.5 FM, Community Radio) is a radio station broadcasting a country music format. Licensed to San Augustine, Texas, United States, the station serves the Lufkin-Nacogdoches area. The station is currently owned by Center Broadcasting Company and features programming from Westwood One.

History
The station was assigned the call letters KCOT on 1992-08-21. On 2001-08-15, the station changed its call sign to KQSI. On 2010-08-31, the station changed their call letters to KDET-FM and again to the current KXXE on June 29, 2014.

References

External links

XXE
Radio stations established in 1992